Nartakee  (Dancer) is a 1963 Indian social film directed by Nitin Bose. The story and screenplay were written by Dhruv Chatterji, with dialogues by S. K. Prabhakar. Produced by Mukund Trivedi for Film Bharti, its director of photography was Nana Ponkshe. Director Bimal Roy did the editing for the film. Choreography was by Sohanlal, assisted by choreographer Saroj. The music director was Ravi and the lyricist was Shakeel Badayuni. The film starred Sunil Dutt and Nanda in key roles with Om Prakash, Agha, Zeb Rehman, Pritibala and Aruna Irani.

According to Nanda, as stated in an interview to journalist Ranjan Das Gupta, "It was Nitin Bose who extracted the best from me as an actress in Nartaki. He followed Satyajit Ray's style of realistic film making and advised me to use the least amount of makeup".

The story was about a dancing girl (Nanda) brought up in the Tawaif (courtesan) milieu, who wants to better herself with an education. She is helped amidst great societal clash, by a newly arrived Professor (Sunil Dutt).

Cast
 Nanda as Lakshmi
 Sunil Dutt as Professor Nirmal Kumar
 Om Prakash as Seth Jamnadas
 Agha as Azaad
 Zeb Rehman
 Pritibala as Ratna
 Aruna Irani 
 Nana Palsikar as Professor Varma
 Chandrima Bhaduri as Lakshmi's Aunt, Rampiary
 Moni Chatterjee as the Principal
 Polson

Soundtrack
The music was composed by Ravi, with Shakeel Badayuni's lyrics. One of the popular song from this film was "Zindagi Ke Safar Mein Akele The Ham" sung by Mohammed Rafi. A critically acclaimed song was "Zindagi Ki Uljhanon Ko Bhool Kar" sung by Asha Bhosle. The other popular song was "Aaj Duniya Badi Suhani Hai" sung by Asha Bhosle. The playback singers were Asha Bhosle, Mahendra Kapoor, Mohammed Rafi, Usha Khanna and Usha Mangeshkar.

Songlist

References

External links
 

1963 films
1960s Hindi-language films
Indian dance films
Films scored by Ravi